Yellowknife North is a territorial electoral district for the Legislative Assembly of the Northwest Territories, Canada. It is one of seven districts that represent Yellowknife, the territorial capital. It encompasses Old Town, Niven Heights, some of downtown, and a large rural hinterland centered on the Ingraham Trail.

The district previously existed from 1975 to 1999, but was dissolved at the 1999 election.

The riding was recreated for the 2015 election, from part of the former district of Weledeh.

Members of the Legislative Assembly (MLAs)

Election results

2019 election

2015 election

References

External links
 Website of the Legislative Assembly of Northwest Territories

Northwest Territories territorial electoral districts
Yellowknife